The second season of the American television series Legends of Tomorrow, which is based on characters from DC Comics, premiered on The CW on October 13, 2016, and ran for 17 episodes until April 4, 2017. The season follows the Legends, a dysfunctional team of time-traveling superheroes and anti-heroes, and their mission to correct aberrations in time resulting from their first mission together. It is set in the Arrowverse, sharing continuity with the other television series of the universe, and is a spin-off of Arrow and The Flash. The season is produced by Berlanti Productions, Warner Bros. Television, and DC Entertainment, with Phil Klemmer serving as showrunners.

The season was ordered in March 2016. Production began that July and ended in February 2017. Principal cast members Victor Garber, Brandon Routh, Arthur Darvill, Caity Lotz, Franz Drameh, Amy Pemberton, and Dominic Purcell return from the previous season, and are joined by new cast members Maisie Richardson-Sellers, Nick Zano, and The Flash alum Matt Letscher.

Episodes

<onlyinclude>{{Episode table |caption=Legends of Tomorrow, season 2 episodes |background=#9A3506 |overall=5 |season=5 |title=22 |director=13 |writer=26 |airdate=12 |prodcode=7 |viewers=10 |country=U.S. |episodes=

{{Episode list/sublist|Legends of Tomorrow (season 2)
| EpisodeNumber   = 27
| EpisodeNumber2  = 11
| Title           = Turncoat
| DirectedBy      = Alice Troughton
| WrittenBy       = Grainne Godfree & Matthew Maala
| OriginalAirDate = 
| ProdCode        = T13.20011
| Viewers         = 1.77
| ShortSummary    = Rip has been brainwashed into working for the Legion. The Legends, who feel the subsequent timequake, head to Christmas Eve 1776, to protect Washington. As Sara and Mick escort Washington to safety, Rip arrives with British troops who have been armed with modern-day assault rifles. Rip disables the team's technology and shoots Sara in the chest, opting to take Mick and Washington prisoner. Rip then heads to the Waverider with British soldiers to retrieve the Legends' piece of the spear. After Mick hears that Washington will be executed in the morning, he formulates an escape plan and teaches the General what it means to be an American. Rip uses Sara's life as leverage to get Jax to give him the spear fragment before strangling her anyway. The ''Waveriders power is restored and Sara is revived in time to stop an enraged Jax from murdering Rip. Nate and Amaya save Mick and Washington, who goes on to lead his soldiers to victory in the American Revolution. Amaya tells Nate, with whom she shared a tender moment earlier, that they should remain friends and the team celebrates Christmas on the Waverider.
| LineColor       = 9A3506
}}

{{Episode list/sublist|Legends of Tomorrow (season 2)
| EpisodeNumber   = 29
| EpisodeNumber2  = 13
| Title           = Land of the Lost
| DirectedBy      = Ralph Hemecker
| WrittenBy       = Keto Shimizu & Ray Utarnachitt
| OriginalAirDate = 
| ProdCode        = T13.20013
| Viewers         = 1.54
| ShortSummary    = Rip issues an override order to activate the Waveriders self-destruct sequence, but the team manages to reboot Gideon and stop it. They crash land in the Cretaceous period and Ray, Amaya, and Nate venture out to recover a lost timeship part. Mick suggests using a Time Master method of mental programming to travel inside Rip's mind and discover the location of Commander Steel and the final piece of the spear. Sara and Jax travel inside Rip's mind, encountering Savage's men, evil versions of themselves, Gideon in human form, and a trapped Rip. Ray, Nate, and Amaya retrieve the missing part with the latter two starting to develop mutual feelings. Ray, however, advises against this, reminding Nate that Amaya's granddaughter will eventually inherit her abilities. Sara, Jax, and Gideon free Rip's consciousness before Sara and Jax return to reality. Rip shares a kiss with the human Gideon before returning to reality and resuming his role as Captain, informing the team that he knows the location of the last piece of the spear. Meanwhile in 1970, Jack Swigert, Apollo 13's Command Module Pilot, has a meeting with a doctor revealed to be Thawne.
| LineColor       = 9A3506
}}
{{Episode list/sublist|Legends of Tomorrow (season 2)
| EpisodeNumber   = 30
| EpisodeNumber2  = 14
| Title           = Moonshot
| DirectedBy      = Kevin Mock
| WrittenBy       = Grainne Godfree
| OriginalAirDate = 
| ProdCode        = T13.20014
| Viewers         = 1.34
| ShortSummary    = The Legends head to NASA in 1970, where Henry Heywood works as a consultant. Henry reveals that he hid his spear fragment in the flag left by Apollo 11 on the moon and that the Apollo 13 mission is going exactly as planned. Thawne, posing as Jack Swigert, incapacitates the other astronauts. Ray boards the Apollo command module and restrains Thawne before retrieving the spear fragment. The Waverider is damaged when Sara uses the ship to shield the Apollo craft from meteors, stranding Ray on the moon. Ray and Thawne launch themselves off the moon and are caught by the Waverider. The team return to Earth intact after Henry sacrifices himself by opening one of the ''Waveriders outer hatches, being sucked outside the ship. Nate, disappointed that he was not able to create a potentially better life for his family, passes on a message from Henry to his teenage father. Sara and Rip seem to clash over how to captain the ship, but eventually reach an understanding. Amaya asks Gideon to show her the fate of her village and her family, revealing the destruction of her village and existence of her granddaughter Mari, the present-day Vixen.
| LineColor       = 9A3506
}}

}}</onlyinclude>

Cast and characters

Main
 Victor Garber as Martin Stein / Firestorm
 Brandon Routh as Ray Palmer / Atom
 Arthur Darvill as Rip Hunter
 Caity Lotz as Sara Lance / White Canary
 Franz Drameh as Jefferson "Jax" Jackson / Firestorm
 Matt Letscher as Eobard Thawne / Reverse-Flash
 Maisie Richardson-Sellers as Amaya Jiwe / Vixen
 Amy Pemberton as Gideon
 Nick Zano as Nate Heywood / Steel
 Dominic Purcell as Mick Rory / Heat Wave

Recurring
 Neal McDonough as Damien Darhk
 John Barrowman as Malcolm Merlyn / Dark Archer
 Wentworth Miller as Leonard Snart / Captain Cold

Guest

Production

Development
On March 11, 2016, Legends of Tomorrow was renewed for a second season. After the first season, the producers considered adjusting the Legends team for additional seasons, with Joseph David-Jones' Connor Hawke and Megalyn Echikunwoke's Mari McCabe / Vixen potential additions. For the second season, showrunner Phil Klemmer revealed that Arrow writer Keto Shimizu and The Flash writer Grainne Godfree would be working on Legends in order to "make our stories work in concert" with Arrow and The Flash. Klemmer also noted the challenges of creating more crossover elements, since Arrow's lead actor Stephen Amell and The Flash's lead actor Grant Gustin work full days for their respective shows. In terms of working within the Arrowverse, Klemmer said that the death of Laurel Lance on Arrow would "resonate into Season 2... [since] something that happens on Arrow can create ripples that appear on our show in a huge way. It fundamentally alters the DNA of our series." The second season initially consisted of 13 episodes, with four more ordered in November 2016 to bring the season total to 17.

Teasing the premise of season two in April 2016, Klemmer stated, "We're coming at it from a completely different angle. We're determined to make every part of season two feel like its own show. [The first episode of season two] will very much be a new pilot with new good guys, new bad guys, new stakes, new dynamics, new goals. The team will basically have to find a new purpose. Once you save the world, what do you do then?... The fact that the world was in peril sort of forced our team to fall into its own dysfunctional version of lockstep. Season two, they're no longer going to be hunted by Time Masters. They're no longer going to be burdened with having to save the world. It's no longer going to be about saving Miranda and Jonas. The interesting thing about season two is I think it's going to have a much, much different tone because our Legends are going to have a totally different purpose. They're actually going to have a totally different constitution. There will be new faces and new everything." The season also introduced members of the Justice Society of America. The Society consisted of Hourman, Vixen, Commander Steel, Obsidian, Stargirl and Dr. Mid-Nite. The season also featured a version of the Legion of Doom, composed of Eobard Thawne / Reverse-Flash, Malcolm Merlyn, Damien Darhk and Leonard Snart / Captain Cold.

Casting
Main cast members Victor Garber, Brandon Routh, Arthur Darvill, Caity Lotz, Franz Drameh, Amy Pemberton, and Dominic Purcell returned from the previous season as Martin Stein, Ray Palmer, Rip Hunter, Sara Lance, Jefferson Jackson, Gideon, and Mick Rory, respectively. They were joined by Matt Letscher, Maisie Richardson-Sellers and Nick Zano, playing Eobard Thawne, Amaya Jiwe, and Nate Heywood, respectively. Letscher reprised his role from The Flash. It was originally intended for Megalyn Echikunwoke, who voices Mari McCabe / Vixen in the animated web series Vixen, to reprise her role in this series, but due to scheduling conflicts for Echikunwoke, the producers instead cast Sellers as Jiwe, McCabe's grandmother and an earlier incarnation of Vixen. This incarnation was an original creation for the series. Darvill was absent for 5 episodes this season due to his commitment to the ITV series Broadchurch. Pemberton physically portrayed Gideon in the episode "Land of the Lost", unlike earlier episodes where she only voiced the character.

Wentworth Miller, who portrayed Leonard Snart / Captain Cold as a regular in season one, signed a contract with Warner Bros. TV to continue portraying Snart simultaneously on multiple shows in the Arrowverse, including Legends of Tomorrow. John Barrowman and Katie Cassidy, who portrayed Malcolm Merlyn and Laurel Lance respectively on Arrow, signed a similar contract that allowed them to continue being a series regular on Arrow as well as the other Arrowverse shows, including The Flash and Legends of Tomorrow. Neal McDonough, who recurred as Damien Darhk on Arrow and made a guest appearance in season one of Legends of Tomorrow, returned to the series in a recurring capacity. Ciara Renée and Falk Hentschel, who starred as Kendra Saunders / Hawkgirl and Carter Hall / Hawkman respectively in the first season, did not return for the second, with Legends of Tomorrow co-creator Marc Guggenheim saying the writers could not find a suitable story for their characters set after the first season, adding, "The bow was tied so tightly and neatly with their story in the finale, that everything we thought of felt very forced. After 4000 years, they were no longer under the specter of Vandal [Savage], and we felt they need some time off." He added that bringing the duo back at the very beginning of the second season felt "premature."

Filming
Shooting for the season began in July 2016 at Vancouver, and ended in February 2017.

 Arrowverse tie-ins 
In November 2016, the cast of Legends of Tomorrow appeared on The Flash and Arrow as part of the three-part "Invasion!" crossover event; the crossover episodes also featured appearances by Melissa Benoist, reprising her role as Kara Danvers / Supergirl from the TV series Supergirl.

Release

Broadcast
The season began airing on October 13, 2016, on The CW in the United States, and concluded on April 4, 2017.

Home media
The season was made available for streaming on Netflix in late April 2017, soon after the season finale aired. It was later released on Blu-ray on August 15, 2017.

Reception

Ratings

Critical response
Rotten Tomatoes gave the season an 88% approval rating, with an average rating of 6.97/10 based on 10 reviews. The website's consensus reads: "Though the narrative remains too ambitious, DC's Legends of Tomorrow enjoys a freer creative arc with the removal of problem characters." Jesse Schedeen of IGN called it a significant improvement over the first season, saying it reduced "most of what didn't work about Season 1 and added several worthy new characters to the mix." He noted that while the season was "crammed full of compelling character arcs and plot twists", it thrived simply by "offering a sense of whimsical adventure and comedy that be frustratingly hard to find in other live-action DC projects." Caitlin Kelly of Hypable wrote that the reasons Season 2 works so well are because of its new roster, the evolving dynamics of its main characters, great villains, and the fun, which made it easier to not care about plot holes. Several years later, Matthew Sonnack of CBR called Season 2 the best of Legends of Tomorrow, "''with the perfect balance of action, humor, drama, and heart."

Accolades

|-
! scope="row" rowspan="4" | 2017
| rowspan="3" | Leo Awards
| Best Direction in a Dramatic Series
| David Geddes
| 
| 
|-
| Best Visual Effects in a Dramatic Series
| Armen V. Kevorkian, Meagan Condito, Rick Ramirez, Andranik Taranyan, James Rorick
| 
| 
|-
| Best Sound in a Dramatic Series
| Kristian Bailey
| 
| 
|-
| Teen Choice Awards
| Choice TV Actress: Action
| Caity Lotz
| 
| 
|}

Notes

 References General references'''

External links
 
 

2016 American television seasons
2017 American television seasons
Legends of Tomorrow seasons